The Sworn Book of Honorius (also Liber sacer, sacratus or consecratus) is a medieval grimoire purportedly written by Honorius of Thebes. The Latin word "juratus", which is typically translated to "sworn", is intended to mean "oathbound". The book is one of the oldest existing medieval grimoires, as well as one of the most influential.

Historical references
Its date of composition is uncertain, but it is possibly mentioned as Liber Sacer in the 13th century, apparently asserting a date in the High Middle Ages. The first certain historical record is the 1347 trial record of Etienne Pepin from Mende, France. Johannes Hartlieb (1456) mentions it as one of the books used in necromancy. The oldest preserved manuscript dates to the 14th century, Sloane MS 3854 (fol 117-144). Sloane MS 313, dating to the late 14th or early 15th century, was once in the possession of John Dee.

The first printed manuscript of this work did not appear until 1629.

Content
It is supposedly the product of a conference of magicians who decided to condense all of their knowledge into one volume. In 93 chapters, it covers a large variety of topics, from how to save one's soul from purgatory to the catching of thieves or finding of treasures. It has many instructions on how to conjure and command demons, to work other magical operations, and knowledge of what lies in Heaven among other highly sought information. Like many grimoires, it has lengthy dissertations for proper operation and seals to be used.

The book can be classified as a "Solomonic grimoire" due to its heavy use of angelic powers and seals like those found in The Key of Solomon, and its own claim to "lay out the works of Solomon".

Author
The purported author, Honorius of Thebes, is a possibly mythical character from the Middle Ages. Considerable mystery still exists about the identity of Honorius. Honorius of Thebes is also claimed to be the creator of the Theban alphabet, in Heinrich Cornelius Agrippa's De Occulta Philosophia (1533) and Johannes Trithemius's Polygraphia (1518).

According to the Sworn Book of Honorius, he is supposed to be "the son of Euclid, master of the Thebians". The book, however, provides little elucidation as to who this might be; no sources to substantiate the claim are given. The reader might assume that Thebes in Greece is intended, but no better context can be inferred.

Editions 
 Joseph H Peterson, The Sworn Book of Honorius: Liber Iuratus Honorii, Ibis Press (2016), .
 Daniel Driscoll, The Sworn Book of Honourius the Magician, Heptangle Books, 1977.
 Gösta Hedegård, Liber Iuratus Honorii: A Critical Edition of the Latin Version of the Sworn Book of Honorius, Studia Latina Stockholmiensia 48, Almqvist & Wiksell (2002), .

See also 
 The Grimoire of Pope Honorius
 Renaissance magic

References

External links 
 Online edition by Joseph H. Peterson (1998, 1999).

Grimoires
13th-century Latin books
Necromancy